Claudia Beni (born 30 May 1986) is a Croatian pop singer, born in Opatija.

Biography
At the time when she first participated in Dora, the national finals for the Eurovision Song Contest,   Claudia was only 12, but she was already an experienced band singer having performed all over Croatia, Bosnia and Herzegovina, Slovenia and Montenegro with the Teens - formerly known as Mići rokeri (Little Rockers).

After receiving the 2002 Porin prize, Claudia broke away from the Teens. Her first 12-song solo album “Claudia” was released just before the summer of 2002. The singles “Tako hrabar da me ostaviš” (Brave Enough To Leave Me) (one of the songs in the Best New Album awarded at the Split Festival 2001), “Ili ona ili ja” (Either Her or Me) (Zagrebfest 2001), and “Led” (Ice) (HRF 2002) gave Claudia further notability in the national music industry.

In 2003, Claudia represented Croatia at the Eurovision Song Contest 2003, singing "Više nisam tvoja".

Claudia has also worked together with another member of the Croatian pop scene, Ivana Banfić, singing the song “Hrvatice vas vole” (Croatian Women Love You), dedicated to the national football team during the World Cup in Japan which enjoyed no success.

Discography

Albums
"Claudia", released 2002
"Cista kao suza", released 2004

References

1986 births
Living people
Eurovision Song Contest entrants for Croatia
21st-century Croatian women singers
Croatian pop singers
Eurovision Song Contest entrants of 2003
People from Opatija